The Cuenco family is a well-known political family in Cebu, Philippines. Since the 19th century, the Cuenco name has been part the colorful history and lore of this island in Southern Philippines. Members of the Cuenco family have been involved in Philippine politics, literature, journalism, as well as the Catholic religion."
- Cecilia Manguerra Brainard, Filipino-American Writer (who is also related to the Cuenco blood).

The Cuenco's are prominent and legendary in Cebu City.  The family patriarch, Mariano Jesus Cuenco, served in the Senate before martial law and was president of the upper chamber from 1949-1951.  Today, Antonio Cuenco continues the political blood of his ancestors as the Congressman of the 2nd District of Cebu City.

History
Mariano Albao Cuenco & Remedios Lopez Diosmito

The beginnings of this powerful political family can be traced back to Mariano Albao Cuenco, a poet and teacher from Capiz, who married Remedios Diosomito. Remedios originally came from Naic, Cavite, but attended school in Cebu. The couple settled first in Carmen. They later lived in Leyte, but returned to reside in the famous Parian district of Old Cebu. They had 16 children, of which only five survived to adulthood. Jose Maria Cuenco, Mariano Jesus Cuenco, Dolores Cuenco, Remedios Cuenco Borromeo, and Miguel Cuenco. Most of their children died in infancy; a son Jaime died when he was older.

At the turn of the 20th century, shortly after the Philippine–American War, Mariano Albao worked as a Court of Clerk to the American Judge Carlock. He also wrote and founded the Imprenta Rosario where he and his family published several newspapers. He later ran for governor, but lost. His children went on to be powerful figures in politics and religion.

After Mariano Albao died, his wife Remedios took over the management of the Imprenta Rosario and is technically the First Woman Publisher of Cebu.

The Children of Mariano Albao

Mariano Albao and Remedios Diosmito bore sixteen children, to which five survived (Jose Maria Cuenco, Mariano Jesus Cuenco, Dolores Cuenco, Remedios Cuenco Borromeo, and Miguel Cuenco), and to which three of them transcended to become well-known leaders of their provinces.

Senator Mariano Jesús Diosomito Cuenco (January 16, 1888 - February 25, 1964) was born in Carmen, Cebu on January 16, 1888 to Mariano Albao Cuenco and Remedios Lopez Diosomito. He studied at the Colegio de San Carlos of Cebu where he graduated in 1904 with a degree in Bachelor of Arts. He finished law in 1911 at the Escuela de Derecho (later became the Manila Law School) and passed the bar examinations in 1913. With his first wife, Filomena Alesna Cuenco, they bore the bloodline of the political generation, as well as the most recognized generation.

Representative Miguel Cuenco of 5th district, Cebu; National Assembly [House of Representatives]; In office as a Representative 1931-1941, 1944–1946, 1949-1965.

Archbishop Cuenco was born in Carmen, Cebu, Philippines on May 19, 1885, the eldest child of Mariano Albao Cuenco and Remedios Diosomito. He became the Roman Catholic Archbishop of Jaro, Philippines. Jose Maria was in Washington D.C. as a Pensionado in 1906, when he contracted typhoid fever and almost died. During his long convalescence, he began to read the lives of saints and decided to become a priest instead of a lawyer. Ordained a priest in Cebu on June 11, 1914, he went on to become Archbishop of Jaro, Iloilo. As a publisher, he founded El Boletin Catolico and Veritas, an English-Spanish weekly.

Bloodline of Mariano Jesus

With Mariano Jesus' first wife, Filomena Alesna Cuenco, they had seven children; Manuel Cuenco, Concepcion Cuenco Manguerra, Carmen Cuenco, Lourdes Cuenco, Consuelo Cuenco Reyes, Teresita Cuenco Gonzales, and Maria Cuenco.

One out of seven of them became a political leader, and nurtured and influenced a political family; Gov. Manuel Cuenco.

Governor Manuel Cuenco was Cebu's Governor, In office as a Governor during the 1950s. To which he raised up six children with Milagros Cuenco; Antonio Cuenco, Ramon Cuenco, Filomena Cuenco Panis, Jose Cuenco, Jesus Cuenco, and Manuel Cuenco Jr.

Antonio Cuenco became the congressman of 2nd district of Cebu on 1987 until 1998. His wife, Nancy Cuenco, took the title of a congresswoman when she resumed his seat after his term was over. Congressman Antonio Cuenco ran once again for his congressional seat in 2001. Nancy and Antonio had four children; James Cuenco, Ronald Cuenco, Antonio Cuenco Jr. and Cynthia Cuenco Dizon. And to which only two of them developed the political heredity.

Councilor Ronald Cuenco was in office as a Councilor on 1992-2001; then becoming the Consultant/ Office of the Mayor of Cebu City/ Market Affairs 2001-2003.

James Cuenco, on the other hand, became the Chief Legislative Staff Officer, under office of his father, Rep. Antonio Cuenco, House of Representatives. His wife, Marjorie Mejorada Cuenco, became the Supervising legislative staff officer III under office in Research and Reference Bureau, House of Representatives.

Antonio Cuenco's brother, Jesus Cuenco, also became a well-known figure. He served as the President of Cebu's famous Casino Español.

Also, Antonio Cuenco's cousin, Emmanuel Gonzales, became the co-founder and President of Cebu's most famous resort, the Plantation Bay resort.

Cuenco members

In politics 
Mariano Albao Cuenco † - Born 1861; died 1909.  Poet, journalist, grammarian.  Born in Kalibo, Capiz on Dec. 8, 1861.  Attended Normal de Manila and taught in public schools in Sogod and Catmon.  In 1889, moved to Baybay, Leyte to do business.  He returned to Cebu, settling with his family in Colon Street, Parian.  He became a journalist, writing for various papers.  He started the Imprenta Rosario press.  His pseudonym was "Asuang."   Ran for Cebu governor but lost.  Died on July 9, 1909.
Mariano Jesús Cuenco † - Born 1888; died 1964.  Member of the Philippine Assembly 1912-16; 4-term Cebu Representative, 5th district; 2-term Cebu Governor; Senate President and Cabinet Member; Philippine Legislature [Senate]; In office as a Senator 1912-1928, 1941-1964.  Born in Carmen on January 16, 1888.  Like his father, mother, and siblings, he was also a writer and publisher.  He founded the bilingual newspaper, El Precursor (Ang Magu-una), which ran from 1907-eve of World War II.  In 1947, he founded The Republic.
Miguel Cuenco † - Born December 15, 1904; died June 20, 1990. Representative, 5th district, Cebu; National Assembly [House of Representatives]; In office as a Representative 1931-1941, 1944–1946, 1949-1965.
Manuel A. Cuenco † - Cebu Governor, In office as a Governor during the 1950s.
Antonio Cuenco † - Born March 26, 1936; Died June 27, 2020. Representative, 2nd district, Cebu; House of Representatives; In office as a Congressman 1987-1998, 2000–2010; Secretary General of the AIPA Delegation, 2010.
Nancy Cuenco - Representative, 2nd district, Cebu City; House of Representatives; In office as a Congresswoman 1998-2001.
James Anthony Cuenco - Chief legislative staff officer; Office of father, Rep. Antonio Cuenco, House of Representatives; In office up to present.
Marjorie M. Cuenco - Supervising legislative staff officer III; Research and Reference Bureau, House of Representatives; Up to present. Lawyer.
Ronald R. Cuenco - Councilor; Cebu City; In office as a Councilor 1992-2001, 2010–Present; Consultant/ Office of the Mayor of Cebu City/ Market Affairs 2001-2003; Cebu City Councilor 2010–present.

In religion 
Jose Maria Cuenco - Roman Catholic Archbishop of Jaro, Philippines. Born in Carmen, Cebu Province on May 19, 1885, died October 8, 1972. Jose Maria was in Washington D.C. as a Pensionado in 1906, when he contracted typhoid fever and almost died.  During his long convalescence, he began to read the lives of saints and decided to become a priest instead of a lawyer.  Ordained a priest in Cebu on June 11, 1914, he went on to become Archbishop of Jaro, Iloilo.  As a publisher, he founded El Boletin Catolico and Veritas, an English-Spanish weekly.

References

External links
Cuenco Family History
Concepcion Cuenco Manguerra Memorial Site

 
People from Cebu
Philippine literature